Holly Lane SSSI is a 0.5 hectare geological Site of Special Scientific Interest near the village of Walton St. Mary, North Somerset, notified in 1990.

This Geological Conservation Review site shows deep subaerial sands and breccias burying a fossil cliff, shoreplatform,
wave-cut notch and cave. The sands are of Pleistocene age and thought to be aeolian (windblown) coversands. They contain recycled foraminifera (eroded from older rocks) and open-ground terrestrial mollusca. Fossils of mammalian fauna include horse, bear, wolf, fox and several rodent species.

References

Sites of Special Scientific Interest in Avon
Sites of Special Scientific Interest notified in 1990